Langley Green is an area of Oldbury, on the B4169 road, in the Metropolitan Borough of Sandwell, in the English county of West Midlands. The appropriate ward of Sandwell is simply called Langley. The population at the 2011 census was 12,969. Langley Green has a library, a theatre and a railway station called Langley Green railway station. The Oldbury Rep Theatre, which had its first production in 1944, moved to its current location in 1956. The theatre is Sandwell's only purpose-built theatre. It hosts a variety of productions and has established itself as a community theatre providing a venue for local organisations and schools.

Before 1844, the locality was shared between the counties of Shropshire and Worcestershire in an extremely complicated manner.

Langley Green is the birthplace of footballer Fred Wheldon who played for local clubs Rood End White Star and Langley Green Victoria in the mid-to-late 1880s before moving on to Small Heath in 1890, Aston Villa in 1896 and West Bromwich Albion in 1900. He was capped  four times for England. In the summer months he played cricket for Worcestershire.

See also
Q3 Academy Langley

References

 A-Z Birmingham (page 97)

External links
 Oldbury Rep Theatre

Areas of Sandwell
Oldbury, West Midlands